Suarek Rukkukamui is a Thai kickboxer and Muay Thai fighter.

As of August 2020, he was ranked the #8 flyweight in the world by Combat Press.

Titles and accomplishments

 2011 Muay Lok Cup -59kg Muay Marathon Champion
 2012 M-1 World Lightweight Champion
 2017 REBELS Super Lightweight Champion
 2019 REBELS interim Lightweight Champion
 2020 KNOCK OUT Red Grand Prix 61.5kg Champion
 2021 M-1 World Super Lightweight Champion

Fight record
{{Kickboxing record start|norec=y|title=Fight record|record=105 Wins (39 (T)KO's), 40 Losses, 11 Draws}}
|-  style="text-align:center; background:#cfc;"
| 2023-03-05 || Win||align=left| Daiki Watabe|| KNOCK OUT 2023 SUPER BOUT BLAZE  || Tokyo, Japan || Decision (Unanimous) || 3 ||3:00 
|-  bgcolor="#fbb"
| 2022-04-17|| Loss ||align=left| REITO BRAVELY ||KNOCK OUT 2022 vol.3 || Tokyo, Japan || Ext.R KO (Left cross)|| 4 || 1:58  
|-  bgcolor="#cfc"
| 2021-12-18|| Win||align=left| Nobu BRAVELY || KODO 7 || Beppu, Japan || Decision (Unanimous)|| 5 || 3:00 
|-
! style=background:white colspan=9 |
|-  bgcolor="#fbb"
| 2020-09-22|| Loss||align=left| Yota Shigemori ||KNOCK OUT 2021 vol.3 || Tokyo, Japan || Decision (Unanimous)|| 5 || 3:00  
|-
! style=background:white colspan=9 |

|-  bgcolor="#fbb"
| 2021-02-07|| Loss||align=left| Hiroki Kasahara ||SHOOT BOXING 2021 act.2|| Tokyo, Japan || TKO (Corner stoppage) || 2 || 2:18
|-  bgcolor="#cfc"
| 2020-09-22|| Win||align=left| Yota Shigemori ||KNOCK OUT CHAMPIONSHIP.2, 61.5kg Grand Prix Final || Tokyo, Japan || Decision (Unanimous)|| 3 || 3:00  
|-
! style=background:white colspan=9 |
|-  bgcolor="#cfc"
| 2020-09-22|| Win ||align=left| Kazuma Takahashi ||KNOCK OUT CHAMPIONSHIP.2, 61.5kg Grand Prix Semi Finals || Tokyo, Japan || Ext.R KO (Punches) || 4 || 0:45
|-  style="background:#cfc;"
| 2020-02-11 || Win|| align=left| Ryutaro|| KNOCK OUT CHAMPIONSHIP.1 || Tokyo, Japan || Decision (Unanimous) || 5 || 3:00
|-  style="background:#cfc;"
| 2019-10-06 || Win|| align=left| Shunsuke Miyabi || REBELS.63×KNOCK OUT || Tokyo, Japan || Decision (Unanimous) || 5 || 3:00
|-
! style=background:white colspan=9 |
|-  style="background:#cfc;"
| 2019-08-10 || Win|| align=left| Shota Saenchai GYM || REBELS.62 || Tokyo, Japan || Decision (Unanimous) || 3 || 3:00
|-  style="background:#cfc;"
| 2019-04-20 || Win|| align=left|  Kazuki Fukada || REBELS.60 || Tokyo, Japan || KO (Left Hook) || 2 || 0:47
|-  style="background:#fbb;"
| 2018-12-05 || Loss|| align=left| Keijirou Miyakoshi || REBELS.59 || Tokyo, Japan || KO (Left Hook) || 5 || 1:52
|-  style="background:#cfc;"
| 2018-09-24 || Win|| align=left| Masanobu Goshu || K-1 World GP 2018: inaugural Cruiserweight Championship Tournament || Saitama, Japan || Decision (Unanimous) || 3 || 3:00
|-  style="background:#cfc;"
| 2018-06-06 || Win|| align=left|  Takuya Sugimoto || REBELS.56 || Tokyo, Japan || KO (Left Hook) || 2 || 0:31
|-
! style=background:white colspan=9 |
|-  style="background:#fbb;"
| 2018-03-21 || Loss|| align=left| Kosuke Komiyama || K-1 World GP 2018: K'FESTA.1 -60kg World Tournament, Quarter Finals || Saitama, Japan || KO (left high kick) || 1 || 2:56
|-  style="background:#cfc;"
| 2017-11-24 || Win|| align=left| Shinji Suzuki || REBELS.53 || Tokyo, Japan || Decision (Unanimous) || 5 || 3:00
|-
! style=background:white colspan=9 |
|-  style="background:#fbb;"
| 2017-09-06|| Loss ||align=left| Genji Umeno || REBELS.52 || Tokyo, Japan || Decision || 5 || 3:00
|-  style="background:#cfc;"
| 2017-06-11 || Win|| align=left| Pilao Santana || REBELS.51 || Tokyo, Japan || KO (Left Hook) || 1 || 3:00
|-  style="background:#fbb;"
| 2017-04-23 || Loss|| align=left| Sun Zhixiang	 || Kunlun Fight 60 || Guizhou, China || Decision || 3 || 3:00
|-  style="background:#c5d2ea;"
| 2017-03-11 || Draw|| align=left| Pan Ryunson || REBELS.49 || Tokyo, Japan || Decision  || 5 || 3:00
|-  style="background:#cfc;"
| 2016-11-30 || Win|| align=left| Taison Maeguchi || REBELS.47 || Tokyo, Japan || Decision (Unanimous) || 3 || 3:00
|-  style="background:#cfc;"
| 2016-07-10 || Win|| align=left| Raiden HIROAKI || REBELS.44 || Tokyo, Japan || Decision (Unanimous) || 5 || 3:00
|-  style="background:#cfc;"
| 2016-05-05 || Win|| align=left| Sho SaenchaiGym || J-KICK 2016～Honor the fighting spirits～2nd|| Tokyo, Japan || TKO (Doctor Stoppage/cut) || 3 || 2:08
|-  style="background:#cfc;"
| 2012-06-17 || Win|| align=left| Kanongsuk Weerasakreck || Muay Lok 2012 2nd || Tokyo, Japan || Decision (Unanimous) || 5 || 3:00
|-
! style=background:white colspan=9 |
|-  style="background:#cfc;"
| 2012-03-18 || Win|| align=left| Kanongsuk Weerasakreck || Muay Lok 2012 1st || Tokyo, Japan || Decision (Majority) || 5 || 3:00
|-  style="background:#fbb;"
| 2011-09-19 || Loss|| align=left| Yasuyuki || Kick Boxing Union || Tokyo, Japan || Decision (Unanimous) || 5 || 3:00
|-  style="background:#fbb;"
| 2011-08-07 || Loss|| align=left| Shuwa Tanaka || Muay Lok 2011 3rd || Tokyo, Japan || TKO (Elbow) || 5 || 2:28
|-  style="background:#cfc;"
| 2011-07-17 || Win|| align=left| HIRΦKI || K-U NKB Houi Agare !|| Kyoto, Japan || Decision (Majority) || 5 || 3:00
|-  style="background:#c5d2ea;"
| 2011-04-02 || Draw|| align=left| Saengmorakot Chuwattana || Muay Lok 2011 2nd|| Tokyo, Japan || Decision (Majority) || 5 || 3:00
|-  style="background:#cfc;"
| 2011-02-20 || Win|| align=left| Lak Acegym || Muay Lok 2011 1st, Muay Lok -59kg Cup,  Final|| Tokyo, Japan || Decision (Unanimous) || 3 || 3:00
|-  style="background:#cfc;"
| 2011-02-20 || Win|| align=left| Eshinin B-Family Neo || Muay Lok 2011 1st, Muay Lok -59kg Cup, Semi Final|| Tokyo, Japan || Decision (Split) || 3 || 3:00
|-
|-
| colspan=9 | Legend''':

References

1986 births
Suarek Rukkukamui
Living people
Suarek Rukkukamui